Antônio Roberto Monteiro Simões is a Brazilian-born linguist interested in the phonetics and phonology of the Romance languages. Simões is an associate professor of Spanish and Portuguese linguistics at the University of Kansas, in Lawrence, USA, where he teaches Hispanic linguistics. He has authored books, textbooks and articles contrasting the Portuguese and Spanish languages. Simões is currently conducting research work on speech models and foreign language learning models, especially in relation to phonetics and phonology. Simões work on modeling is a continuation of his Ph.D. thesis; an adaptation of the late Dennis Klatt's 1976 pioneering model to predict duration in connected speech.

Career 

Simões' B.A. was conferred at Central College, in the town of Pella, Iowa, United States, after withdrawing his undergraduate work at the Universidade Federal do Espírito Santo, Vitória, Brazil. He earned his Ph.D. at the University of Texas at Austin in 1987. Prior to coming to Austin, Simões did his graduate studies at the University of Provence, in Aix-en-Provence, France; and the University of North Carolina at Chapel Hill.

Bibliography

Books

 Simões, A.R.M. 2008. Pois não. Brazilian Portuguese for Speakers of Spanish, with Basic Reference Grammar. Austin, TX: University of Texas Press. http://www.utexas.edu/utpress/books/simpop.html (Pois não is an offspring of another textbook, Com licença! )
 Teschner, Richard and Antônio R.M. Simões 2007. Brazilian Portuguese Pronunciation.  Baltimore, Maryland: LivroText. http://lbr.uwpress.org/content/45/1/214.citation;  https://www.amazon.ca/Pronouncing-Brazilian-Portuguese-Richard-Teschner/dp/0942566939
 Simões, Antônio R.M.; Ana Maria Carvalho, Lyris Wiedemann (eds.) (2004). Português para falantes de espanhol: Artigos selecionados escritos em português e inglês. Campinas, Spain: Pontes. .
 Simões, A.R.M. 1992. Com licença! Brazilian Portuguese for Spanish speakers. Austin, TX: University of Texas Press and Institute of Latin American Studies (Second reprint 1997).
 Dale A. Koike and Antônio R.M. Simões, eds. 1989. Negotiating for meaning: papers on foreign language teaching and testing.  Austin, TX: Department of Foreign Language Education Studies.

Articles 

 Simões, A.R.M. 2006. Clitic Attachment in Brazilian Portuguese, in Hispania, vol. 89, no. 2, 380-389. dialnet.unirioja.es/servlet/articulo?codigo=1977683
 Simões, A.R.M. and E.C. Papanastasiou, 2002. Evaluating the usefulness and properties of a subjective assessment of Brazilian Portuguese. In Hispania, 85.3:618-28, September 2002. https://www.jstor.org/stable/4141151
 Simões, A.R.M. 1996. Duration as an element of lexical stress in Spanish discourse: An acoustical analysis. Hispanic Linguistics, vol. 8/2, 352-368. sequence of article published in 1992, “The phonetics of discourse: strong syllable positions in Mexican Spanish and Brazilian Portuguese.” In Proceedings of the workshop on prosody in natural speech.
 Simões, A.R.M. 1996. Assessing the contribution of instructional technology in the teaching of pronunciation. Proceedings of the Fourth International Conference on Spoken Language Processing, Philadelphia, PA, University of Delaware and Alfred I. duPont Institute, III, 843-46. http://ieeexplore.ieee.org/xpls/abs_all.jsp?arnumber=607891&tag=1
 Simões, A.R.M. 1996. Phonetics in Second Language Acquisition: an acoustic study of fluency in adult learners of Spanish. In Hispania, 1, 79:825-33.
 Simões, A.R.M. 1992. The phonetics of discourse: strong syllable positions in Mexican Spanish and Brazilian Portuguese. In Proceedings of the workshop on prosody in natural speech. Philadelphia: Institute for Research in Cognitive Sciences.
 Simões, A.R.M. 1991. Modeling shortening and lengthening in connected speech. In 1990 Mid-America linguistic conference papers, Frances Ingemann, editor. Lawrence, KS: Department of Linguistics, University of Kansas, 355-62.
 Simões, A.R.M. 1991. Towards a phonetics of discourse. In Cadernos de estudos lingüísticos—IEL.  Campinas, Brazil: UNICAMP, 21, 59-78. (amplified version of article published in 1991, Modeling shortening and lengthening in connected speech. 1990 Mid-America Linguistic Conference Paper)
 Simões, A.R.M. and Orlando R. Kelm  1991. O processo de aquisição das vogais semi-abertas "é, ó" do português (brasileiro) como língua estrangeira. In Hispania, 74, 3, 654-65.

Book reviews 

 Simões, A.R.M. 2011. Review of Leow, Ronald P., Héctor Campos, and Donna Lardière (Eds.). Little Words: Their History, Phonology, Syntax, Semantics, Pragmatics, and Acquisition. Washington, DC: Georgetown University Press, 2009. 246 pages. In Modern Language Association.  http://onlinelibrary.wiley.com/doi/10.1111/j.1540-4781.2011.01212_3.x/abstract
 Simões, A.R.M. 2011. Review of Português para falantes de espanhol – Ensino e Aquisição, Portuguese for Spanish Speakers – Teaching and Acquisition, Lyris Wiedemann and Matilde V.R. Scaramucci, organizers/editors, Campinas, São Paulo: Pontes Editores, 2008. In Hispania.

References 
 "Affiliated Faculty Profile", University of Kansas. Retrieved 16 May 2014.

Living people
Linguists from Brazil
University of Provence alumni
University of North Carolina at Chapel Hill alumni
Central College (Iowa) alumni
University of Kansas faculty
University of Texas at Austin alumni
Year of birth missing (living people)